Larsmo is a municipality of Finland, located in the Ostrobothnia region.

Larsmo is also the name of one of the villages in the municipality of Larsmo. The municipality is bilingual with Swedish as the majority language and Finnish as the minority language. Until 2014 Swedish was Larsmo's only official language. The municipality consists of an archipelago of about 360 islands and numerous skerries. Lake Larsmo, which is Finland's largest artificial fresh water lake, is also located in the municipality.

History
The land which was to become Larsmo rose from the sea some 2,000 years ago, due to post-glacial rebound. Today the municipality consists of more than 360 islands.

The administrative municipality Larsmo was founded in 1867, having previously belonged to the parish of Pedersöre. Hunting, fishing and agriculture used to be important sources of income. However, industry and service have now taken over since the changes of agriculture nowadays require larger farms to be profitable. The businesses are mainly influenced by the strong traditions of crafting or boat building.

The municipality came to play an interesting role in the Finnish independence-movement. During the dark autumn night of December 6, 1905, the steamer S/S John Grafton sailed into the Larsmo archipelago with its cargo of weapons, meant to be used for the independence movement in Finland and the revolutionary attempts in Russia. The cargo was unloaded and transported away with the help of the local population. However, the ship ran aground when the ship was heading out to sea. The crew decided to blow up the ship before the Russian guards would find it. The crew fled to Sweden with some smaller sailing vessels and the ship was blown up on December 8. News about the mystical ship spread around the world, and were mentioned in i.e. The Times, Deutsche Tageblatt, and the Daily Mail. This incident is often counted as the first attempt for a free Finland and to obtain independence from Russia. S/S Equity, another ship, loaded with weapons, also unloaded its cargo in the Larsmo archipelago, and a memorial plate is now in place at the Tolvmangrundet island.

Emigration 
Emigrants from Larsmo founded the town of Larsmont, Minnesota, in the United States in the early 1900s. They originally requested to name the town Larsmo, but railroad officials did not approve and instead chose the name Larsmont.

Coat-of-arms
The municipal coat-of-arms was officially approved in 1952. The coat-of-arms symbolizes the boat-building and fishing traditions in the municipality.

Demographics

Religions
 Evangelical Lutheran Church of Finland
 Laestadianism
 Conservative Laestadianism

Settlements
The two largest islands are called Larsmo and Eugmo, and these two islands also make up the two administrative villages of the municipality. Other larger settlements are Risö häll, Holm, Eugmo, and Bosund. The church village is called Fagernäs and is located on the Larsmo island.

Politics
Results of the 2011 Finnish parliamentary election in Larsmo:

Christian Democrats 42.7%
Swedish People's Party 37.3%
Social Democratic Party 13.8%
True Finns 2.8%
National Coalition Party 0.9%
Centre Party 0.8%
Left Alliance 0.8%
Green League 0.4%

Economy
The municipality has always been connected to ship building and still is. Among the more well-known ship-building companies are Baltic Yachts, which builds high-tech sailing yachts in carbon fiber, as well as Bella boats.

Culture

A number of cultural events are held every summer in the municipality. A small jazz festival, called  ('barn jazz'), is arranged every summer at the stone barn in Fagernäs. Many famous jazz artists have appeared at the festival. Many events are also held at Köpmanholmen and at Bjärgas hembygdsgård. A fish market is held every summer at the fishing harbour in Bosund.

There are two museums in the municipality. The previously mentioned Bjärgas hembygdsgård portrays rural society in the 1930s and also a countryside shop from the 1950s. The Bosund boat and fishing museum displays older boats and fishing and hunting equipment. The exhibit Terra Mare at Köpmanholmen shows how post-glacial rebound has affected the coastal landscape.

The two libraries in Holm and in Bosund serve the inhabitants of the municipality. Further, there are two more school libraries, one in Risö and one in Näs.

Transportation
Roads
Larsmo is located between the cities of Jakobstad in the south and Kokkola in the north. The lively trafficked Seven Bridges' Road goes through Larsmo and connects the municipality with the mainland. The road's official designation is Regional Road 749.

Buses
The INGSVA (previously: Haldin & Rose) bus company has a number of lines going through the municipality.

Railroad
There is no railroad in the municipality. The closest stops are located in Bennäs or Kokkola.

Airports
There is also a small field for ultra-light aircraft in Bosund.

Ferries
The closest ferry route to Sweden is Wasaline from Vaasa in Finland to Umeå in Sweden. Jakob Lines, which went from Jakobstad and Kokkola, ceased activity in 1999.

Recreation
There are a number of paved pedestrian roads in the municipality. There are walking paths of different lengths in Holm (8 and 13 km), as well as in Fagernäs (5 km), Bosund (8 km) and on Öuran (5.7 km).

The winter sports are concentrated to Holm where there are 5.5 km of skiing paths as well as facilities for biathlon. Ice hockey rinks are located in Risö, Holm, Näs and Bosund.

There are nine un-supervised beaches in the municipality: Vikarholmen, Assarskär, Fagernäs, Kackur, Sonamo, Köpmanholmen, Annäsgrundet, Svennasminne och Brännbacka. Most of them have dressing rooms, toilets and life-saving equipment.

Sports
The soccer club Larsmo bollklubb was founded in 1952 and is currently in Division 4, where they usually are located among the top teams. The ice hockey team IF Pucken is currently playing in Division 3.

Attractions
The archipelago
Larsmo church, which was constructed in 1787, and designed by Jakob Rijf.
The Grafton monument
Köpmanholmen

Twin towns
: Klæbu
: Malå

References

External links

 – Official website
Lake Larsmo
A panoramic picture from the Öuran island
Picture of the Grafton monument

Municipalities of Ostrobothnia (region)
Populated places established in 1867